Santali, Bengali: , Odia: , Devanagari: , also known as Santal, is the most widely-spoken language of the Munda subfamily of the Austroasiatic languages, related to Ho and Mundari, spoken mainly in the Indian states of Assam, Bihar, Jharkhand, Mizoram, Odisha, Tripura and West Bengal. It is a recognised regional language of India per the Eighth Schedule of the Indian Constitution. It is spoken by around 7.6 million people in India, Bangladesh, Bhutan and Nepal, making it the third most-spoken Austroasiatic language after Vietnamese and Khmer.

Santali was a mainly oral language until the development of the Ol Chiki script by Pandit Raghunath Murmu in 1925. Ol Chiki is alphabetic, sharing none of the syllabic properties of the other Indic scripts, and is now widely used to write Santali in India.

History
According to linguist Paul Sidwell, Munda languages probably arrived on the coast of Odisha from Indochina about 4000–3500 years ago, and spread before the Indo-Aryan migration to Odisha.

Until the nineteenth century, Santali had no written language and all shared knowledge was transmitted by word of mouth from generation to generation. European interest in the study of the languages of India led to the first efforts at documenting the Santali language. Bengali, Odia and Roman scripts were first used to write Santali before the 1860s by European anthropologists, folklorists and missionaries including A. R. Campbell, Lars Skrefsrud and Paul Bodding. Their efforts resulted in Santali dictionaries, versions of folk tales, and the study of the morphology, syntax and phonetic structure of the language.

The Ol Chiki script was created for Santali by Mayurbhanj poet Raghunath Murmu in 1925 and first publicised in 1939.

Ol Chiki as a Santali script is widely accepted among Santal communities. Presently in West Bengal, Odisha, and Jharkhand, Ol Chiki is the official script for Santali literature & language. However, users from Bangladesh use Bengali script instead.

Santali was honoured in December 2013 when the University Grants Commission of India decided to introduce the language in the National Eligibility Test to allow lecturers to use the language in colleges and universities.

Geographic distribution 

The highest concentrations of Santali language speakers are in Santhal Pargana division, as well as East Singhbhum and Seraikela Kharsawan districts of Jharkhand, the Jangalmahals region of West Bengal (Jhargram, Bankura and Purulia districts) and Mayurbhanj district of Odisha.

Smaller pockets of Santali language speakers are found in the northern Chota Nagpur plateau (Hazaribagh, Giridih, Ramgarh, Bokaro and Dhanbad districts), Balesore and Kendujhar districts of Odisha, and throughout western and northern West Bengal (Birbhum, Paschim Medinipur, Hooghly, Paschim Bardhaman, Purba Bardhaman, Malda, Dakshin Dinajpur, Uttar Dinajpur, Jalpaiguri and Darjeeling districts), Banka district and Purnia division of Bihar (Araria, Katihar, Purnia and Kishanganj districts), and tea-garden regions of Assam (Kokrajhar, Sonitpur, Chirang and Udalguri districts). Outside India, the language is spoken in pockets of Rangpur and Rajshahi divisions of northern Bangladesh as well as the Morang and Jhapa districts in the Terai of Province No. 1 in Nepal.

Santali is spoken by over seven million people across India, Bangladesh, Bhutan, and Nepal. According to 2011 census, India has a total of 7,368,192 Santali speakers (including 3,58,579 Karmali, 26,399 Mahli). State wise distribution is Jharkhand (2.75 million), West Bengal (2.43 million), Odisha (0.86 million), Bihar (0.46 million), Assam (0.21 million) and a few thousand in each of Chhattisgarh, Mizoram, Arunachal Pradesh and Tripura.

Official status 
Santali is one of India's 22 scheduled languages. It is also recognised as the additional official language of the states of Jharkhand and West Bengal.

Dialects 
Dialects of Santali include Kamari-Santali, Karmali (Khole), Lohari-Santali, Mahali, Manjhi, Paharia.

Phonology

Consonants 
Santali has 21 consonants, not counting the 10 aspirated stops which occur primarily, but not exclusively, in Indo-Aryan loanwords and are given in parentheses in the table below.

* only appears as an allophone of // before //.

In native words, the opposition between voiceless and voiced stops is neutralised in word-final position. A typical Munda feature is that word-final stops are "checked", i. e. glottalised and unreleased.

Vowels 
Santali has eight oral and six nasal vowel phonemes. With the exception of /e o/, all oral vowels have a nasalized counterpart.

There are numerous diphthongs.

Morphology 
Santali, like all Munda languages, is a suffixing agglutinating language.

Nouns 
Nouns are inflected for number and case.

Number 
Three numbers are distinguished: singular, dual and plural.

Case 
The case suffix follows the number suffix. The following cases are distinguished:

Possession 
Santali has possessive suffixes which are only used with kinship terms: 1st person -ɲ, 2nd person -m, 3rd person -t. The suffixes do not distinguish possessor number.

Pronouns 
The personal pronouns in Santali distinguish inclusive and exclusive first person and anaphoric and demonstrative third person.

The interrogative pronouns have different forms for animate ('who?') and inanimate ('what?'), and referential ('which?') vs. non-referential.

The indefinite pronouns are:

The demonstratives distinguish three degrees of deixis (proximate, distal, remote) and simple ('this', 'that', etc.) and particular ('just this', 'just that') forms.

Numerals 
The basic cardinal numbers (transcribed into Latin script IPA) are:

The numerals are used with numeral classifiers. Distributive numerals are formed by reduplicating the first consonant and vowel, e.g. babar 'two each'.

Numbers basically follow a base-10 pattern. Numbers from 11 to 19 are formed by addition, "gel" ('10') followed by the single-digit number (1 through 9). Multiples of ten are formed by multiplication: the single-digit number (2 through 9) is followed by "gel" ('10'). Some numbers are part of a base-20 number system. 20 can be "bar gel" or "isi".

Verbs 
Verbs in Santali inflect for tense, aspect and mood, voice and the person and number of the subject and sometimes of the object.

Subject markers

Object markers 
Transitive verbs with pronominal objects take infixed object markers.

Syntax 
Santali is an SOV language, though topics can be fronted.

Influence on other languages

Borrowing between Santali and other Indian languages has not yet been studied fully. In modern Indian languages like Western Hindi the steps of evolution from Midland Prakrit Sauraseni could be traced clearly. In the case of Bengali such steps of evolution are not always clear and distinct, and one has to look at other influences that moulded Bengali's essential characteristics.

A notable work in this field was initiated by linguist Byomkes Chakrabarti in the 1960s. Chakrabarti investigated the complex process of assimilation of Austroasiatic family, particularly Santali elements, into Bengali. He showed the overwhelming influence of Bengali on Santali. His formulations are based on the detailed study of two-way influences on all aspects of both languages and tried to bring out the unique features of the languages. More research is awaited in this area.

Notable linguist Khudiram Das authored the 'Santali Bangla Samashabda Abhidhan', a book focusing on the influence of the Santali language on Bengali and providing a basis for further research on this subject. 'Bangla Santali Bhasha Samparka is a collection of essays in E-book format authored by him and dedicated to linguist Suniti Kumar Chatterji on the relationship between the Bengali and Santali languages.

See also 
 Languages of India
 Languages with official status in India
 List of Indian languages by total speakers
 National Translation Mission
 Santali Wikipedia
 Ol Chiki script

References

Works cited

Further reading
 Byomkes Chakrabarti (1992). A comparative study of Santali and Bengali. Calcutta: K.P. Bagchi & Co. 
 Hansda, Kali Charan (2015). Fundamental of Santhal Language. Sambalpur.
 Hembram, P. C. (2002). Santali, a natural language. New Delhi: U. Hembram.
 Newberry, J. (2000). North Munda dialects: Mundari, Santali, Bhumia. Victoria, B.C.: J. Newberry. 
 Mitra, P. C. (1988). Santali, the base of world languages. Calcutta: Firma KLM.
 Зограф Г. А. (1960/1990). Языки Южной Азии. М.: Наука (1-е изд., 1960).
 Лекомцев, Ю. K. (1968). Некоторые характерные черты сантальского предложения // Языки Индии, Пакистана, Непала и Цейлона: материалы научной конференции. М: Наука, 311–321.
 
 Maspero, Henri. (1952). Les langues mounda. Meillet A., Cohen M. (dir.), Les langues du monde, P.: CNRS.
 Neukom, Lukas. (2001). Santali. München: LINCOM Europa.
 Pinnow, Heinz-Jürgen. (1966). A comparative study of the verb in the Munda languages. Zide, Norman H. (ed.) Studies in comparative Austroasiatic linguistics. London—The Hague—Paris: Mouton, 96–193.
 
 Vermeer, Hans J. (1969). Untersuchungen zum Bau zentral-süd-asiatischer Sprachen (ein Beitrag zur Sprachbundfrage). Heidelberg: J. Groos.
 2006-d. Santali. In E. K. Brown (ed.) Encyclopedia of Languages and Linguistics. Oxford: Elsevier Press.

Dictionaries 
 Bodding, Paul O. (1929). A Santal dictionary. Oslo: J. Dybwad.
 
 English-Santali/Santali-English dictionaries
 Macphail, R. M. (1964). An Introduction to Santali, Parts I & II. Benagaria: The Santali Literature Board, Santali Christian Council.
 Minegishi, M., & Murmu, G. (2001). Santali basic lexicon with grammatical notes. Tōkyō: Institute for the Languages and Cultures of Asia and Africa, Tokyo University of Foreign Studies.

Grammars and primers 
 Bodding, Paul O. 1929/1952. A Santal Grammar for the Beginners, Benagaria: Santal Mission of the Northern Churches (1st edition, 1929).
 
 Macphail, R. M. (1953) An Introduction to Santali. Firma KLM Private Ltd.
 Muscat, George. (1989) Santali: A New Approach. Sahibganj, Bihar : Santali Book Depot.
 
 Saren, Jagneswar "Ranakap Santali Ronor" (Progressive Santali Grammar), 1st edition, 2012.

Literature 
 Pandit Raghunath Murmu (1925) ronor : Mayurbhanj, Odisha Publisher ASECA, Mayurbhanj
 Bodding, Paul O., (ed.) (1923—1929) Santali Folk Tales. Oslo: Institutet for sammenlingenden kulturforskning, Publikationen. Vol. I—III.
 
 Murmu, G., & Das, A. K. (1998). Bibliography, Santali literature. Calcutta: Biswajnan. 
 
 The Dishom Beura, India's First Santali Daily News Paper. Publisher, Managobinda Beshra, National Correspondent: Mr. Somenath Patnaik

External links

 National Translation Mission's (NTM) Santali Pages
 OLAC resources in and about the Santali language
 OLAC resources in and about the Mahali language
 RWAAI Repository and Workspace for Austroasiatic Intangible Heritage
 Santali language in RWAAI Digital Archive

 
Munda languages
Santhal
Official languages of India
Languages of Assam
Languages of Bihar
Languages of Jharkhand
Languages of Mizoram
Languages of Odisha
Languages of Tripura
Languages of West Bengal
Languages of Bangladesh
Languages with own distinct writing systems
Languages written in Indic scripts
Languages attested from the 19th century
Santali people
Sahitya Akademi recognised languages
Languages of Koshi Province